The Torontonians is a 1960 Canadian novel by Phyllis Brett Young. In the U.S. and the U.K. the novel was published under the titles Gift of Time and The Gift of Time.

After falling out of print the novel was re-released in 2007 by McGill-Queen's University Press.

The novel follows unhappy housewife Karen Whitney who has grown bored of her upper-middle class lifestyle in the Toronto suburb of Rowanwood and begins to contemplate suicide.

Reception and release
The novel became an international bestseller upon its release however it fell out of print and into obscurity.

Years later a friend of academic Suzanne Morton gifted a secondhand copy of the novel to Morton. After reading the book she championed a re-release of the novel by McGill university's academic press.

References 

1960 Canadian novels
Novels set in Toronto